Azhar Lodhi is a Pakistani former newscaster and commentator who worked at the Pakistan Television primarily during 1966–1988.

Life and career
Lodhi was born in Jalandhar, British India. Later his family migrated to Pakistan and settled in Rawalpindi. He joined PTV as a newscaster in 1966. A Gallup survey held in 1986 stated that he was the 2nd most famous news caster on PTV. 

He was removed from PTV after he covered funeral procession of the late president General Muhammad Zia-ul-Haq.

Awards and recognition

References

Pakistani television people
Commentators
Living people
Year of birth missing (living people)
Recipients of the Pride of Performance
Pakistani television newsreaders and news presenters
People from Jalandhar